Seema Samridhi also known as Seema Samridhi Kushwaha (born 10 January 1982) is an advocate at the Supreme Court of India and national spokesperson of Bahujan Samaj Party. She is known for being legal counsel of victim in 2012 Delhi gang rape and murder case. Because of her long legal fighting, all the four adult convicts were executed by hanging at Tihar Jail on 20 March 2020.

Early life and education 
She was born in a small village Ugrapur, Gram Panchayat Bidhipur Block Mahewa Tehsil Chakarnagar in Etawah district of Uttar Pradesh to Baladin Kushwaha and Ramkuanri Kushwaha. Her father, Baladin Kushwaha was Gram Pradhan of Bidhipur Gram Panchayat. She completed her graduation in LL.B. from Chhatrapati Shahu Ji Maharaj University in 2005. She also received Bachelor of Journalism degree in 2006 from Uttar Pradesh Rajarshi Tandon Open University. After then, she did her M.A. in political science. She started legal practicing at the Supreme Court of India in 2014.

Legal activism 
When Nirbhaya's case came into light, she as a law trainee at that time participated in various protest demanding for justice. She officially became Nirbhaya's lawyer in 2014 demanding capital punishment for all four adult convicts as soon as possible. On 24 January 2014, she joined Nirbhaya Jyoti Trust as a legal adviser. Nirbhaya Jyoti Trust is an institution founded by the victim's parents to assist women who have experienced violence to find shelter and legal assistance. This was her first case. She pushed for Fast track court listing. Nevertheless, due to numerous review and curative petitions by convicts and slowness of the legal system, the case got delayed until finally, on 4 March 2020, a last death warrant was issued by court with the execution date as 20 March 2020 at 5:30 a.m. On 20 March 2020, at 5:30 a.m. IST, the four adult convicts were executed by hanging at Tihar Jail.

References 

1982 births
Living people
Supreme Court of India lawyers
21st-century Indian lawyers
21st-century Indian women lawyers
People from Etawah district
Chhatrapati Shahu Ji Maharaj University alumni